Euriphene ernestibaumanni, or Baumann's nymph, is a butterfly in the family Nymphalidae. It is found in Ivory Coast, Ghana, Togo, Nigeria, Cameroon and the Democratic Republic of the Congo. The habitat consists of forests.

Subspecies
Euriphene ernestibaumanni ernestibaumanni (eastern Ivory Coast, Ghana: Volta region, Togo, eastern Nigeria, western Cameroon)
Euriphene ernestibaumanni integribasis (Hulstaert, 1924) (Democratic Republic of the Congo: Kasai, Sankuru, Lualaba)

References

Butterflies described in 1895
Euriphene
Butterflies of Africa